The McKay Range is a small, low mountain range in northwestern British Columbia, Canada, located on the southern coast of Graham Island in the Haida Gwaii. It has an area of 60 km2 and consists of hills. It is a subrange of the Queen Charlotte Mountains which in turn form part of the Insular Mountains.

References

Queen Charlotte Mountains